Lyle Arnold "Mickey" Roth (born May 24, 1927) was a Canadian ice hockey player with the Lethbridge Maple Leafs. He won a gold medal at the 1951 World Ice Hockey Championships in Paris, France. The 1951 Lethbridge Maple Leafs team was inducted to the Alberta Sports Hall of Fame in 1974. He also played with the Stratford Kroehlers and Stratford Indians.

References

1927 births
Possibly living people
Canadian ice hockey centres
Ice hockey people from Ontario